Donald or Don Burton may refer to:

Don Burton (1907–after 1986), American owner of radio station WLBC-FM#History
Don Burton (politician) (1920–2007), Australian legislator
Donald Burton (1934–2007), English theatre and television actor
Don Burton (born 1962), Canadian music manager (Dolores O'Riordan#1989–2003: The Cranberries and marriage)